Kendall's W (also known as Kendall's coefficient of concordance) is a non-parametric statistic for rank correlation. It is a normalization of the statistic of the Friedman test, and can be used for assessing agreement among raters and in particular inter-rater reliability. Kendall's W ranges from 0 (no agreement) to 1 (complete agreement).

Suppose, for instance, that a number of people have been asked to rank a list of political concerns, from the most important to the least important. Kendall's W can be calculated from these data. If the test statistic W is 1, then all the survey respondents have been unanimous, and each respondent has assigned the same order to the list of concerns. If W is 0, then there is no overall trend of agreement among the respondents, and their responses may be regarded as essentially random. Intermediate values of W indicate a greater or lesser degree of unanimity among the various responses.

While tests using the standard Pearson correlation coefficient assume normally distributed values and compare two sequences of outcomes simultaneously, Kendall's W makes no assumptions regarding the nature of the probability distribution and can handle any number of distinct outcomes.

Steps of Kendall's W 

Suppose that object i is given the rank ri,j by judge number j, where there are in total n objects and m judges. Then the total rank given to object i is

and the mean value of these total ranks is

The sum of squared deviations, S, is defined as

and then Kendall's W is defined as

If the test statistic W is 1, then all the judges or survey respondents have been unanimous, and each judge or respondent has assigned the same order to the list of objects or concerns. If W is 0, then there is no overall trend of agreement among the respondents, and their responses may be regarded as essentially random. Intermediate values of W indicate a greater or lesser degree of unanimity among the various judges or respondents.

Kendall and Gibbons (1990) also show W is linearly related to the mean value of the Spearman's rank correlation coefficients between all  possible pairs of rankings between judges

Incomplete Blocks 
When the judges evaluate only some subset of the n objects, and when the correspondent block design is a (n, m, r, p, λ)-design (note the different notation). In other words, when

 every object is ranked exactly the same total number r of times,
 and each pair of objects is presented together to some judge a total of exactly λ times, a constant for all pairs.

Then Kendall's W is defined as 

If  and  so that each judge ranks all n objects, the formula above is equivalent to the original one.

Correction for Ties 
When tied values occur, they are each given the average of the ranks that would have been given had no ties occurred. For example, the data set {80,76,34,80,73,80} has values of 80 tied for 4th, 5th, and 6th place; since the mean of {4,5,6} = 5, ranks would be assigned to the raw data values as follows: {5,3,1,5,2,5}.

The effect of ties is to reduce the value of W; however, this effect is small unless there are a large number of ties. To correct for ties, assign ranks to tied values as above and compute the correction factors 
 
where ti is the number of tied ranks in the ith group of tied ranks, (where a group is a set of values having constant (tied) rank,) and gj is the number of groups of ties in the set of ranks (ranging from 1 to n) for judge j. Thus, Tj is the correction factor required for the set of ranks for judge j, i.e. the jth set of ranks. Note that if there are no tied ranks for judge j, Tj equals 0.

With the correction for ties, the formula for W becomes

Steps of Weighted Kendall's W 

In some cases, the importance of the raters (experts) might not be the same as each other. In this case, the Weighted Kendall's W should be used. Suppose that object  is given the rank  by judge number , where there are in total  objects and  judges. Then, the total rank given to object  is

and the mean value of these total ranks is,

The sum of squared deviations, is defined as,

and then Weighted Kendall's W is defined as,

The above formula is suitable when we do not have any tie rank.

Correction for Ties 
In case of tie rank, we need to consider it in the above formula. To correct for ties, we should compute the correction factors,

where  represents the number of tie ranks in judge  for object .  shows the total number of ties in judge .
With the correction for ties, the formula for Weighted Kendall's W becomes, 

If the weights of the raters are equal (the distribution of the weights is uniform), the value of Weighted Kendall's W and Kendall's W are equal.

Significance Tests 
In the case of complete ranks, a commonly used significance test for W against a null hypothesis of no agreement (i.e. random rankings) is given by Kendall and Gibbons (1990)

Where the test statistic takes a chi-squared distribution with  degrees of freedom.

In the case of incomplete rankings (see above), this becomes

Where again, there are  degrees of freedom.

Legendre compared via simulation the power of the chi-square and permutation testing approaches to determining significance for Kendall's W. Results indicated the chi-square method was overly conservative compared to a permutation test when . Marozzi extended this by also considering the F test, as proposed in the original publication introducing the W statistic by Kendall & Babington Smith (1939):

Marozzi found the F test performs approximately as well as the permutation test method, and may be preferred to when  is small, as it is computationally simpler.

Software 
Kendall's W and Weighted Kendall's W are implemented in MATLAB, SPSS, R, and other statistical software packages.

See also
Maurice Kendall
Kendall's tau
Spearman's rank correlation coefficient
Friedman test

Notes

References

Kendall, M. G., & Gibbons, J. D. (1990). Rank correlation methods. New York, NY : Oxford University Press.
Corder, G.W., Foreman, D.I. (2009). Nonparametric Statistics for Non-Statisticians: A Step-by-Step Approach Wiley, 
Dodge, Y. (2003). The Oxford Dictionary of Statistical Terms, OUP. 
Legendre, P (2005)  Species Associations: The Kendall Coefficient of Concordance Revisited. Journal of Agricultural, Biological and Environmental Statistics, 10(2), 226–245. 

Inter-rater reliability
Nonparametric statistics
Rankings